The Nativ College Leadership Program in Israel (lt. path) is a nine-month, post-high-school gap year program in Israel for mostly North American Jews. It operates under the auspices of the United Synagogue of Conservative Judaism, and draws its participants mostly from USY and Ramah camps.

About Nativ 
Nativ is the academic gap-year program of the United Synagogue of Conservative Judaism (USCJ). Founded in 1981 as an opportunity for high school graduates to gain insight into Judaism and Israel through academic studies at the Hebrew University of Jerusalem and volunteering on a religious kibbutz, Nativ has expanded to multiple tracks of academic and social justice volunteer programming over its 40 years of existence. The Nativ program has over 2,000 alumni (Nativ.org). Nativ is based at the Shirley & Jacob Fuchsberg Center for Conservative Judaism, located in Jerusalem at 6 Agron Street. Nativers live at Beit Nativ, the adjoining youth hostel at 8 Agron Street, which is minutes away from Ben Yehuda Street and  Emek Refaim.

History and Purpose 
Nativ was founded in 1981 as Conservative Judaism’s answer to similar year-long, post-high school programs like the nonpartisan but Zionist Young Judaea Year Course (founded in 1956). Nativ serves as a form of continuity for members of the Conservative movement’s youth programs including United Synagogue Youth (USY) and Ramah Camps. Additionally, the Nativ program engages and prepares participants for Jewish life in college and leadership roles in Conservative synagogues and the larger Jewish community later in life (Wikipedia, “Nativ College Leadership Program in Israel”).

Nativ (“path”) refers to a path from youth to adulthood that includes Jewish education, Israel, and communal engagement and references the lyrics sung in synagogues as the Torah is removed from the Torah Ark: “Her ways are ways of pleasantness, and all her paths are peace (Proverbs 3:17).”

Leadership 
There have been four Nativ Directors since 1981: Shimon Lipsky (Nativ 1-8), David Keren (Nativ 9-24), Yossi Garr (Nativ 25-38), and Nahum Binder (Interim Director, Nativ 39-40) (Facebook, “Nativ Program”). Prior to serving as Nativ Director, both Yossi Garr and Nahum Binder served as Nativ staff members- Mr. Garr on Nativ 16 and Mr. Binder on Nativ 19 and 21.

Participants 

Nativ is USCJ’s college leadership program in Israel for in-bound college freshman from North America. Nativ’s website describes itself as “a powerful immersive experience for the Conservative Jewish leaders of tomorrow.” Of its alumni, Nativ says they, “enter college life infused with leadership skills and a focus on supporting the Jewish community (Web Archive, Nativ.org). Nativ participants are between the ages of 18 and 19 years old from North America and must have completed high school or equivalency. The majority of Nativ participants receive college acceptance and defer admission for one year. 
Candidates for Nativ apply through the International Office of United Synagogue Youth in New York and require a personal interview with a Nativ representative. Admission decisions are made by a joint committee of United Synagogue and Hebrew University/Oranim College or Conservative Yeshiva personnel. Candidates are evaluated based upon academic qualifications, leadership ability, and “commitment to the principles for which Nativ stands (Ibid.).”

Nativ allows participants to earn 12-16 college credits that may be transferable upon continuing studies. Nativ graduates have gone on to attend every Ivy League university, the University of California system, York University, McGill University, and the George Washington University among others (Nativ.org).

The Nativ Program 
Nativ describes its purpose as providing, “a unique opportunity to explore new directions on the journey to becoming a Jewish adult (Web Archive, Nativ.org).” 

The Nativ program consists of two components: Fall and Spring. During the Fall, Nativ participants have the option of participating in several tracks: Hebrew University of Jerusalem, Ulpan Hebrew language intensive, or the Conservative Yeshiva. In the Spring, participants volunteer in community service projects throughout Israel (Ibid.). From 1981-2005, the Spring semester was spent on Kibbutz Sa’ad- a religious kibbutz in the Negev Desert. As the Nativ program expanded, Kibbutz Sa’ad could no longer accommodate Nativ with enough volunteer opportunities or housing. Today, Nativ participants can choose to spend their Spring semester volunteering in Yeruham, Tiberias, or the Yemin Orde Youth Village. 

Yeruham is actively involved in absorbing hundreds of new immigrants to Israel from the Former USSR. These immigrants comprise 25% of the town's nearly 10,000 residents. Students from Nativ “help teach English in the local high schools and yeshivot, work with the Magen David Adom ambulance corps, teach in preschools and much more (jewishvirtuallibraryorg).”

In Tiberias, Nativ participants volunteer teaching English in a variety of educational settings: kindergartens (gan) as teachers assistants and in elementary schools, high schools, and schools for students with special needs (Nativ.org).

Yemin Orde is a religious/observant youth village for immigrant high school students located twenty minutes from Haifa. “While living in Yemin Orde during the second half of the year, Nativers become involved in all facets of youth village life and will have the chance to make a serious impact on the lives of struggling Israeli teenagers. Nativ students will work in the school, the Kitchen and gardening alongside the youth of the village (Nativ.org).” Yemin Orde Nativ participants volunteer in the Daycare/Preschool, maintaining the petting zoo, community gardening and landscaping, and working in the youth village’s kitchen. Participants also assist in schools and yeshivas by tutoring students that require extra attention, organizing after school programming, and general maintenance to beautify and keep the youth village operational (Ibid.).

In both Tiberias and Yemin Oded, Nativ participants have the opportunity to volunteer with Magen David Adom (MDA)- Israel’s medical rescue service. Nativ participants complete a week-long, 60-hour training to prepare them as certified MDA medical volunteers and assist ambulance drivers and medics on emergency calls. Yemin Oded participants can split volunteer time between the schools and the ambulance in Haifa with two days a week at each site (Nativ.org).

Jewish Life on Nativ 

While on Nativ, participants live in a “dedicated and committed Conservative Jewish community.” As part of this community environment, participants experience multiple Jewish learning opportunities and Jewish observance is mandatory.  Participants are expected to observe Shabbat by attending services and refraining from prohibited activities according the standard set by the North American and the Israeli Committee of Jewish Laws and Standards of the Conservative Movement. Nativ holds a group Shabbat once a month and the entire Nativ group has meals, programming, and services together. All meals provided by Nativ in dining halls and during programming observe laws of Kashrut and participants are expected to maintain these standards while alone and during free time (Web Archive, Nativ.org).

Leadership Training 
Nativ separates itself from other similar gap-year programs as a leadership training program. Throughout the year, Nativers learn through interactive and innovative formal and informal (experiential) settings. Leadership training includes seminars, Yom Nativ, and travel to learn about history at the source. These trainings are designed to cultivate Jewish leaders, educators, and community leaders (Ibid.).

Week-long seminars are held throughout the second semester of Nativ to enhance academic and volunteer experiences. These seminars include Conservative Judaism, Israel Experience (archaeological dig with the Office of Antiquities, a week-long trip to Poland, and a three-week trip to India with the JDC and Gabriel Project), and Israel Activism (Nativ.org).

During the second semester, Tuesdays are designated for group activities organized by the participants. Past Yom Nativ have included programming about Israeli start-up companies including tours of company offices, hikes around Yeruham and a visit to a local Bedouin village, and “Eurovision” themed talent shows (Ibid.).

Exploring Israel 

Throughout the year, Nativers participate in day tours and three major tiyulim (trips) in order to gain “a deeper knowledge and understanding of the land of Israel as well as the culture”. Longer trips, divided by intensity of hikes, include a week-long sukkot tiyul, Negev tiyul, and Galil tiyul, and desert survival training (Web Archive, Nativ.org).

Financial Information 
The cost of Nativ for the 2020-2021 Nativ year was $26,500. This includes round-trip airfare between New York and Tel Aviv, tuition and fees, housing, medical insurance, meals, required transportation, and all planned sightseeing and touring (Nativ.org).

Academic Curriculum 
Throughout the year, Nativ participants learn first-hand about Israeli society through a combination of structured academic coursework and experiential opportunities. 

A true year of exploration, Nativ provides the freedom for personal discovery as well as the security of a carefully structured program. This unforgettable experience is created through an intricate balance between academics and volunteer work, learning and teaching, personal challenge and community living. Participants on Nativ return from the year with a stronger attachment to the land of Israel as well as a deeper passion for Judaism, enthusiastic to share with their communities what they have learned (Web Archive, Nativ.org).
 
The Masa Israel webpage explains the academic curriculum of Nativ:
The program includes academic university classes, intensive Hebrew classes and innovative leadership training. Nativ enables recent high school graduates to earn college credits for their studies while living in a classroom without walls.

A year of true exploration, Nativ provides the freedom for personal discovery as well as the security of a carefully structured program. This unforgettable experience is created through an intricate balance between academics and volunteer work, learning and teaching, personal challenge and community living. Participants on Nativ return from the year with a stronger attachment to the land of Israel as well as a deeper passion for Judaism, enthusiastic to share with their North American communities what they have learned (MasaIsrael.org).
During the first six weeks of Nativ, preparatory courses provide a foundation of knowledge about Israel and Judaism and, in the fall semester, students take courses in Jewish, Israel, Middle East, and behavioral studies, and Modern Hebrew (Hebrew University of Jerusalem Webpage, “Academic Partnerships”).
Over the course of the first semester, participants have the option to take courses on Israel, Judaism, and the Hebrew language taught by renowned teachers at Hebrew University’s Rothberg International School on Mount Scopus (Nativ.org). Alternatively, Nativ offers a Conservative Yeshiva track for students to study Talmud, Halacha, and Tanakh and classes exclusively for Nativ participants in philosophy, Conservative Judaism, Zionism and Modern Israel, and Midrash (ibid.) or an intensive Hebrew language Ulpan 4 days a week for 5-6 academic hours a day (ibid.)

Yozma 
The United Synagogue of Conservative Judaism currently offers the only academic gap-year program for young adults with cognitive and social developmental challenges: Yozma. “Yozma participants further the development of life and leadership skills that are essential for young adults with cognitive and social challenges to lead independent, meaningful Jewish lives and successfully transition to a college program.” In addition to many of the same opportunities offered in the classic Nativ program, Yozma participants have social and communication skills training, additional staff members, and courses that are tailored to each individual participant’s abilities (Nativ.org).

Notable alumni of the Nativ program 

Michael Levin (February 17, 1984 – August 1, 2006, Nativ 22) an American-born lone soldier in the Israeli Defense Force that was killed during the Second Lebanon War (lonesoldiercenter.com, “Michael Levin”) and the subject of the 2007 documentary film “A Hero in Heaven (Michael Levin Lone Soldier Foundation).”

Bari Weiss (March 25, 1984 – present, Nativ 22) a former op-ed editor of the Wall Street Journal and staff editor of the New York Times and author of How to Fight Anti-Semitism (2019) (Wikipedia, “Bari Weiss”).

Impact on Participants 

According to the Nativ website, 96% of Nativ alumni become involved with at least one Jewish organization on their college campus with 78% of alumni serving in leadership positions of Jewish organizations in college. 91% of Nativ alumni believe Nativ prepared them for college life and 63% of Nativ alumni felt the program helped them make more informed Jewish decisions (uscj.org).

Nativ tracks 
Nativ splits into different tracks for each semester.

First semester (September–January)

Hebrew University 
Nativers attend the Rothberg International School at Hebrew University in Jerusalem.

Conservative Yeshiva 
Nativers study at the Conservative Yeshiva.

Ulpan/volunteering 
Nativers intensively learn Hebrew through almost daily Ulpan classes, and volunteer as well.

Second semester (February–June)

Youth Village 
Based in Yemin Orde.

Kehilla (community service) 
Based in Yeruham, where Nativers offer to serve in the Magen David Adom, comparable to the Red Cross, the other option is to volunteer helping teach English in the school.

Notable alumni 
 Alexander Gould, American actor
 Michael Levin
 Bari Weiss (born 1984), American opinion writer and editor

References

External links 
 Nativ Homepage
 Hebrew University Nativ Information

N